Hebius kerinciensis  is a species of snake of the family Colubridae. The snake is found in Indonesia.

References 

kerinciensis
Reptiles of Indonesia
Reptiles described in 2003
Taxa named by Indraneil Das